"Ring" is the thirtieth single by B'z, released on October 4, 2000. This song is one of B'z many number-one singles in Oricon charts. It was the drama Asu o Dakishimete's theme song. The single were less successful, charting only at #37 in the Oricon 2000 yearly Charts, with 546,000 copies sold in 7 weeks of chartrun. It became also their first single since Itoshii Hitoyo Good Night... to sell less than 600,000 copies.

Track listing 
Ring - 4:02
Guilty - 3:28

Certifications

References 
B'z performance at Oricon

External links
B'z official website

2000 singles
B'z songs
Oricon Weekly number-one singles
Japanese television drama theme songs
Songs written by Tak Matsumoto
Songs written by Koshi Inaba
2000 songs